Invalidovna is a Prague Metro station on Line B, located in Karlín, Prague 8. The station was opened on 22 November 1990 as part of the extension from Florenc to Českomoravská. It currently lies along the extension from Florenc to Černý Most.

References

External links

 Gallery and information 

Prague Metro stations
Railway stations opened in 1990
1990 establishments in Czechoslovakia
Railway stations in the Czech Republic opened in the 20th century